Thrash is a surname. Notable people with the surname include:

Dox Thrash (1893–1965), American artist
James Thrash (born 1975), American football player
Thomas W. Thrash Jr. (born 1951), American judge
William G. Thrash (1916–2011), United States Marine Corps general